Kaïs is a district (daira) in Khenchela Province, Algeria. It was named after its capital, Kaïs.

Municipalities
The district is further divided into 3 municipalities:
Kaïs
Rémila
Taouzient(Fais)

Districts of Khenchela Province